William A. Schnader (October 5, 1886March 18, 1968) was Attorney General of Pennsylvania and co-founder of the law firm Schnader, Harrison, Segal & Lewis.

Schnader graduated from Franklin & Marshall College in 1908. After earning a law degree from the University of Pennsylvania Law School, Schnader went on to become Special Deputy Attorney General of Pennsylvania in 1923 and Attorney General in 1930.  He served as the Attorney General of Pennsylvania under two successive governors, during which time he directed major new codifications of the laws of corporations and banking. In 1934, Schnader was an unsuccessful Republican candidate for governor. He lost to Democrat George Howard Earle.

In 1935, following his unsuccessful bid for Governor of Pennsylvania,  Schnader and Bernard G. Segal, the former Deputy Attorney General, joined with Francis A. Lewis, who had been a partner in another law firm and the treasurer of Schnader's gubernatorial campaign, to form the law firm of Schnader & Lewis in Philadelphia. Shortly thereafter, they added Bernard Segal as a named partner.  In the early years, the members of the firm gained prominent clients and soon national recognition handling a major case heard by the Supreme Court of the United States.  In 1948, Earl G. Harrison, after resigning as Dean of the University of Pennsylvania Law School, joined the firm as the fourth named partner.

Schnader was active in creating the Uniform Commercial Code  – in fact, he dedicated nearly twenty years of his life to the organization, drafting, development and promotion of a nationwide system of business law, which earned him the title, "Father of the Uniform Commercial Code."  Notably, much of this work was accomplished while in a wheelchair following a crippling stroke.  For this "conspicuous service to American jurisprudence," he was awarded the Gold Medal of the American Bar Association in 1960.  His public service included many other contributions, including five years' work as Chairman of the American Bar Association Bill of Rights Committee (the forerunner of the present Section of Individual Rights and Responsibilities), and service as President of the Pennsylvania Bar Association in 1962–63.

Notes

External links
 History and Background: Schnader Harrison Segal & Lewis LLP
 William A. Schnader's biography as it appears in the archives of Franklin & Marshall College, where he served as a Trustee
 The William A. Schnader papers collection held by the Pennsylvania Historical and Museum Commission
 Listing of William A. Schnader's papers held by Temple University Library
 The Philadelphia Home Rule Charter, which was created by a drafting committee chaired by William A. Schnader

Pennsylvania Attorneys General
1886 births
1968 deaths
University of Pennsylvania Law School alumni
Franklin & Marshall College alumni
Pennsylvania Republicans
20th-century American politicians